Quetta Gladiators (Urdu,; Pashto: کویټه ګلیډیټرز) is a Pakistani professional Twenty20 cricket franchise that competes in the Pakistan Super League (PSL). They play most home games at the Gaddafi Stadium. The Gladiators won and became the champions in PSL 2019. The team is nominally based in Quetta, the provincial capital of Balochistan, Pakistan. 

The franchise was established in 2015 as a result of the formation of PSL by the Pakistan Cricket Board (PCB). The team's homeground is Bugti Stadium. The team is captained by Sarfaraz Ahmed and coached by former Pakistani wicket-keeper Moin Khan and Azam Khan is the team's manager. Abdul Razzaq is the assistant coach.

The leading run-scorer of the team is Sarfaraz Ahmed while the leading wicket-taker is Mohammad Nawaz.

Franchise history 

In December 2015, the Pakistan Cricket Board unveiled the owners of all five city-based franchises for the inaugural season of the Pakistan Super League. The Quetta franchise was sold to the Karachi-based company Omar Associates for US$11 Million.

2016 and 2017 seasons: Runners-Up

Quetta began their 2016 campaign with comfortable wins over Islamabad United and Karachi Kings before edging past Peshawar Zalmi in a closely fought match. A defeat against Lahore Qalanders was followed by a big win over Islamabad in which New Zealand all-rounder Grant Elliott, who had just joined the team, proved instrumental in the win as he took 3 key wickets to restrict United to 117. The win took the team to the top of the table and was followed by a victory against Karachi which saw the Gladiators confirmed as the first team to make the play-off stage of the 2016 season.

Quetta finished 2nd in the Pakistan Super League (PSL) table behind Peshawar, winning six of their eight matches. In the first qualifier match Quetta defeated Peshawar by one run, with the Gladiators scoring 133 runs thanks to a score of 53 runs by Kevin Pietersen and 37 runs by Kumar Sangakkara. In reply, Peshawar scored 132 runs after taking the match to the last ball. This win qualified Quetta for the final in which they lost to Islamabad by six wickets, posting a total of 174/7 with scores of 64 runs by Ahmed Shehzad and 55 runs by Sangakkara.

Ahmed Shehzad finished as the team's leading run scorer with 290 runs, whilst  Mohammad Nawaz took 13 wickets to be the leading wicket-taker for the team.

As for 2017 season, Kumar Sangakkara and Grant Elliott were released by Quetta just a few days before the PSL transfer window came to an end in September 2016. Sangakara was taken by Karachi Kings while Grant Elliot joined the Lahore Qalandars.

Quetta retained 10 players in advance of the 2017 Pakistan Super League players draft and signed eight during the draft. The signings including foreign players Rovman Powell,  Carlos Brathwaite, Tymal Mills, and David Willey. However, of these only Tymal Mills will be joining the team as the other players were unavailable. Mahmudullah Riad and Rilee Rossouw joined the team as a replacement for Mohammad Nabi and David Willey while Nathan McCullum and Thisara Perera replaced Rovman Powell and Carlos Brathwaite. A number of reasons have forced the changes, from injury to some players to others not getting no-objection certificates to scheduling clashes with international cricket.

In their opening game of the 2017 season, Quetta Gladiators defended a target of 137 runs against the Lahore Qalanders. The match was closely fought and went down to the penultimate over where the Gladiators won by 8 runs. Debutant Hasan Khan emerging player of Quetta was adjudged player-of-the-match for his all-round performance of 2 important wickets and a quick-fire 16 runs at the end. In the following match, Gladiators beat Karachi Kings by 7 wickets. After an initial stutter in pursuit of 160, which saw them at 30/3, Riley Roussow and Sarfaraz Ahmed combined in an unbeaten partnership of 130 for the fourth wicket to take the Gladiators home with 5 balls to spare. Rilee Rossouw was adjudged man-of-the-match for his unbeaten, match-winning knock of 76 off 53 balls.

During the second leg of the tournament, in Sharjah, the Gladiators suffered their first loss of the season at the hands of defending champions, Islamabad United. After putting up a target of 149 in their 20 overs, which saw the Gladiators struggling to accelerate their innings, they lost by 5 wickets. In the following game, against Peshawar Zalmi, the match was abandoned after repeated showers and the two teams shared the points from the bout. Continuing their campaign, the Gladiators successful chased down 201 against the Lahore Qalandars in what many pundits labelled as the match-of-the-season. Kevin Pieterson and Sarfaraz Ahmad were instrumental in the chase through a 101-runs partnership. The former who was going through a lean patch in this PSL struck form and hit 88 from 42 balls - including 8 sixes, as the Gladiators plundered 78 runs from the last 3.5 overs to seal the match.

As the tournament shifted back to Dubai, the Gladiators continued their winning streak by beating Karachi Kings by six wickets. The team's chase of 155 runs was commandeered by a 105-run opening partnership between Ahmad Shahzad 54 runs off 40 balls and Asad Shafiq 45 runs off 33 balls - the highest of this edition's PSL. This win also effectively made the Gladaiotrs the first team to qualify for the playoffs. Continuing on, the team lost both of their last two matches of the league stage - against Islamabad United and Peshawar Zalmi respectively. In the former, the Gladiators imploded in the chase of 166 despite a 2nd-wicket partnership of 133 runs between Kevin Pieterson 69 runs off 43 balls and Ahmad Shahzad 53 runs off 43 balls. Requiring, seven runs from the last two overs, the team fell short by 1 run. In the next match, the Gladiators could only manage a below-par score of 128 runs batting first. However, the team fielded and bowled quite well to have the chasing Zalmis reduce to 52-6 before Shahid Afridi took his team home with two wickets to spare.

In the playoff, the Gladiators beat Peshawar Zalmi by 1 run in a thrilling contest. Batting first, the team posted a heavy 201-runs target on the board. This was made possible by aggressive batting from Ahmed Shehzad 71(38) and Kevin Pietersen 40(22) which ensured that the Gladiators were going at a run rate of over 12 runs per over during the first half of the innings. In reply, the Zalmis responded in like and were favourites to win the match before a tight final over from Quetta spinner, Muhammad Nawaz, denied them the winning run. As a result of this match, the Gladiators became the first team to qualify for the final.

In the final, the two teams met again, and Gladiators - the runners-up of the inaugural edition of the PSL, lost to Peshawar Zalmi by 58 runs. Batting first, the Zalmis were struggling at one point at 112 for 6 before Darren Sammy scored 33 runs in the last two overs, taking the team's total to a respectable 148. In reply, the Quetta batsmen never got going and lost wickets at regular intervals, ending up with a team score of just 90. The Gladiator's chances in the final were hurt by the fact that the team's two highest run scorers in the season, Kevin Pietersen and Rilee Rossouw, pulled out of the final in Lahore citing security concerns.

2018 season 

In their opening game of the 2018 season, the Gladiators blemished their 100% success rate against Karachi Kings and lost to them for the first time - by 19 runs in the chase of 150. But in the next match, the Gladiators rebounded with an emphatic 9-wicket-win over Lahore Qalandars. This was their biggest win in terms of wicket margin, as they chased down Qalandar's target of 120 runs in 14 overs.

As the league stage shifted to Sharjah, the Gladiators beat Islamabad United by 6 wickets in the successful chase of a 135-run target. Kevin Pietersen anchored the innings with his contribution of 48 runs. The following match, however, the team lost a thriller against rivals Peshawer Zalmi. Batting first, the Gladiators set a target of 143 runs in a batting display that was punctuated with starts and stops on a two-paced pitch. In reply, the Zalmis were on course for victory at 107-2 before losing three quick wickets to end up requiring 22 runs from the last two overs. At this point, an injured Darren Sammy single-handedly won the match for his team by striking 16 runs from 4 balls to finish the game with 2 balls to go. The Gladiators were comprehensively beaten in the next game by Multan Sultans. Batting first, the team could only muster 102 runs on the board as they suffered a major batting collapse - losing their last 5 wickets for a solitary run. In reply, the Sultans chased down the target with 9 wickets to spare.

As the tournament shifted back to Dubai, the Gladiators experienced a change in fortune. The team won by 2 wickets in a closely fought contest against Multan Sultans. Chasing a target of 153 runs, they lost wickets at regular intervals before cameos from the lower order ensured that the team won off a penultimate-ball six hit by Hasan Khan. The Gladiators continued with their winning streak as they beat Karachi Kings and Peshawer Zalmi in the next two games. Against the Kings, the Gladiators set a target of 181 runs - their highest total of the season. It was built upon strong batting performances by Shane Watson, who scored 90*(58) - the highest individual score in this edition of the PSL - and Kevin Pietersen, who scored 52(34). In reply, the Kings suffered regular wicket losses that culminated in a 67-run loss. Against, the Zalmis, Quetta chased down a target 158 runs in the final over with 6 wickets in hand. The chase was guided by an unbroken 74-runs partnership between Rilee Rossouw and captain, Sarfraz Ahmad.

2019 season: Champions

Gladiators finished the group stage in the second position by winning seven of their matches and losing three. They then defeated Peshawar Zalmi in the qualifier by 10 runs.

In the final in Karachi, the Gladiators defeated Peshawar Zalmi by 8 wickets to win their first title. Gladiators' Mohammad Hasnain was awarded the man of the match award.

2020 season

The team started their season with a win over Islamabad United by 3 wickets in the opening game of the season. In their second match, team lost to Peshawar Zalmi by six wickets. The team won their next two matches against Karachi Kings and Islamabad United respectively, both by five wickets. Quetta then went on a losing streak, facing defeat in their next four matches. Their ninth match was abandoned due to rain. In their last match of the group stage, Quetta defeated Kings by 5 wickets, equaling points with Peshawar Zalmi but failed to qualify for the play-offs for the first time in team's history, due to low run-rate. In the end, they finished in the fifth position at league's table.

2021 season

2022 season

2023 season

Team identity
The team name and the official logo were revealed on 6 January 2016 in Quetta during a ceremony held by team owner Nadeem Omar. The logo depicts a variant of the ancient Roman 'Galea' helmet, worn by gladiators during their fights. The helmet is flanked by two bats that are poised as gladiatorial swords. The team's primary kit colours are purple and golden. The kit was revealed on 7 January 2016 in a launch ceremony held in Quetta.

The team's chant is Kai Kai Quetta, which is taken from the war cry, Kai Kai, coined by the Baloch Regiment during World War II. It literally translates to 'we are coming'.

Anthems

 2016 PSL: "Chaa Jaye Quetta" - Faakhir Mehmood and Faheem Allan Fakir 
 2017 PSL: "Chah Gaya Quetta" - Faakhir Mehmood featuring Sarfaraz Ahmed
 2018 PSL: "Agae Shaan Se Hum" - Zordaar11 featuring Faakhir Mehmood and Aima Baig
 2019 PSL: "We The Gladiators" - DJ Bravo / "Quetta Gladiator Anthem 2019" - Bayaan
 2020 PSL: "Shaan-e-Pakistan Hain Hum" - Harris Jalil Mir and Hasan Bin Hisam
 2021 PSL: "Aar Ya Paar" - Raamis 
 2022 PSL: "Shaan-e-Pakistan" - Bilal Maqsood featuring Ahmed Murtaza

Ambassadors

Before the start of the 2017 season, team's official mascot named "Gladdy" was revealed, making Quetta Gladiators the first team to officially introduce a mascot for the tournament.

In early 2017, Quetta chose pop singer Annie Khalid as their team ambassador. Other notables joining Quetta in ambassadorial roles are Chaman-based footballer Kaleemullah and Quetta-based MMA fighter Ahmed Mujtaba. They were joined by Maya Ali and Faakhir Mehmood as team's brand ambassadors in 2018. Only Maya Ali continued her role in 2019 and 2020. She remained the ambassador in 2021 as well, when she was joined by actor Bilal Ashraf, who was recruited in 2020.

On 23 January 2022, Quetta unveiled the music video of its official anthem for the seventh edition of PSL, which featured actors Adnan Siddiqui and Ushna Shah, and comedian Syed Shafaat Ali.

Sponsors 
For the season 2016, Edenrobe and ACM Gold were the team's title sponsor and official partners respectively. For the second season, Jubilee Insurance became Quetta's main title sponsor. Master Oil became the team's associate sponsor and Chocka and KHL were team's official partners. PTV Sports and Suno FM 89.4 were official media partners, while Tapmad was team's official streaming partner.

Current squad

Management and coaching staff
Nadeem Omar is the owner of the Quetta Gladiators.

Captains

Source: ESPNcricinfo, Last updated: 20 February 2022

Result summary

Overall result in PSL

 Tie+W and Tie+L indicates matches tied and then won or Lost in a tiebreaker such as a bowlout or one-over-eliminator ("Super Over")
 The result percentage excludes no results and counts ties (irrespective of a tiebreaker) as half a win.
Source: ESPNcricinfo, Last updated: 20 February 2022

Head-to-head record

Source: ESPNcricinfo, Last updated: 20 February 2022

Statistics

Most runs 

Source: ESPNcricinfo, Last updated: 18 March 2022

Most wickets 

Source: ESPNcricinfo, Last Updated: 24 January 2022

References

External links
 

 
2015 establishments in Pakistan
Cricket clubs established in 2016
Sports clubs in Pakistan
Cricket in Quetta